Raglan ( or ) is a small beachside town located 48 km west of Hamilton, New Zealand on State Highway 23. It is known for its surfing, and volcanic black sand beaches.

History 

The Ngāti Māhanga iwi occupied the area around Raglan in the late 18th century. There are at least 81 archaeological sites in the area, mainly near the coast. Limited radiocarbon dating puts the earliest sites at about 1400AD. The Māori people named the site  ("the long pursuit"). One tradition says that Tainui priest, Rakataura, crossed Whāingaroa on his way to Kāwhia. Another says it was among the places the early Te Arawa explorer, Kahumatamomoe, with his nephew Īhenga, visited on their expedition from Maketū.

The first Europeans to settle in the area, the Rev James and Mary Wallis, Wesleyan missionaries, were embraced and welcomed by local Māori in 1835. European settlement, including large scale conversion of land to pasture, began in the mid-1850s after a large sale of land by Chief Wiremu Neera Te Awaitaia.

The name "Raglan", adopted in 1858, honours Fitzroy Somerset, 1st Lord Raglan (1788–1855), who had commanded the British forces in the Crimean War of 1853–1856.

The Raglan economy initially featured flax and timber exports, followed by farming which remains the mainstay of the area.

Raglan's first coach link to Hamilton began in 1880 and a telegraph wire was put up beside the road in 1884. In 1904 Raglan was linked to Hamilton telephone exchange. Mains electricity came in 1935 and a sewage scheme in 1977.

Tourism and the arts are significant contributors to the current economy. Raglan and District Museum contains historic artefacts and archives from the region.  A new museum building was built in 2011.

Airfield 

The town became the scene of public civil disobedience campaigns in the 1970s. In 1941, during World War II (1939–1945), the New Zealand Government took local ancestral land from indigenous Māori owners to construct a military airfield. When no longer required for defence purposes, part of the land, a  block, was not returned to the owners, but instead was transferred to Raglan County Council in 1953 and became the public Raglan golf-course in 1968.

There ensued widespread protest and attempts to reoccupy the land; in 1978, 20 Māori protesters were arrested on the ninth hole of the golf course. The land was eventually returned to the owners. 150 people were involved in the protest. 
It became a focus for local job-training and employment programs, as well as for the Māori sovereignty movement. In 2021 the council suggested return of the rest of the land could still "take a number of years". Fencing of the airfield in 2021 halved its width and resulted in a petition to close it.

On August 21, 2022, local councillors unanimously voted to begin the process of returning the airfield land to its original Māori owners.

Local government 
Raglan Highway Board existed from 1868 and merged with the Karioi Board between 1888 and 1892. Raglan Town Board started in 1878 and merged with the highways boards into Raglan County Council in 1889. It was re-inaugurated as Raglan Town Board in 1906 and continued until 1938, when the Board again merged into the County Council. In 1954 Raglan became a county township, administered by a committee of 7 under the jurisdiction of the county council. On 26 March 1957 Raglan Town Committee resigned due to the unsympathetic attitude of the council. Within a month more than 100 ratepayers had petitioned the Governor-General to establish a town board. The Local Government Act 1974 brought about Raglan Community Council, which was replaced by Raglan Community Board in 1989, when Waikato District Council was formed.

Demographics 
In 1859 the local magistrate, F. D. Fenton, reported the population of Whaingaroa as 424. That was the number shown in the 1858 census for the Ngāti Mahanga population of Raglan. That accords with Ferdinand von Hochstetter's account of his 1859 tour, when he said that the Māori population was estimated at 400 and said that he had been told there were 122 Europeans, including 20 farmer-families. Hochstetter said there were six or eight houses, with a tavern and a store in Raglan and a Māori village and an old pā at Horea on the north shore. Many of the Europeans were evacuated in 1860 and again in 1863, when war threatened and it was said 95 inhabitants remained.

After that, as the graph below shows, Raglan's population recovered slowly until the main road from Hamilton was completely metalled in 1921 and then grew again after completion of tar-sealing in 1961.

The population of the Raglan ward (covering most of the harbour catchment area) was 4680 in 2006. It had increased to 4920 in 2013.

The figures and sources are:

Raglan had a population of 3,279 at the 2018 New Zealand census, an increase of 573 people (21.2%) since the 2013 census, and an increase of 651 people (24.8%) since the 2006 census. There were 1,251 households, comprising 1,602 males and 1,677 females, giving a sex ratio of 0.96 males per female. The median age was 39.6 years (compared with 37.4 years nationally), with 672 people (20.5%) aged under 15 years, 477 (14.5%) aged 15 to 29, 1,620 (49.4%) aged 30 to 64, and 507 (15.5%) aged 65 or older.

Ethnicities were 82.9% European/Pākehā, 26.5% Māori, 2.9% Pacific peoples, 2.5% Asian, and 2.7% other ethnicities. People may identify with more than one ethnicity.

The percentage of people born overseas was 21.4, compared with 27.1% nationally.

Although some people chose not to answer the census's question about religious affiliation, 61.8% had no religion, 25.1% were Christian, 1.3% had Māori religious beliefs, 0.3% were Hindu, 0.2% were Muslim, 0.8% were Buddhist and 2.4% had other religions.

Of those at least 15 years old, 732 (28.1%) people had a bachelor's or higher degree, and 402 (15.4%) people had no formal qualifications. The median income was $27,200, compared with $31,800 nationally. 426 people (16.3%) earned over $70,000 compared to 17.2% nationally. The employment status of those at least 15 was that 1,173 (45.0%) people were employed full-time, 522 (20.0%) were part-time, and 87 (3.3%) were unemployed.

Growth by about 500 households is expected by 2045 and to 12,500 by 2070, with several new suburbs.

Property prices have risen sharply since 2000, for example by 49.6% from 2014 to 2017 and a further 42% to 2020. That coincides with a decline in the Māori proportion of the population –

By 2018 there were 6 fewer unoccupied private dwellings at 471, but those occupied had increased to 1,275.

Employment and commuting increased between 2006 and 2013, as shown in this table.

Marae

Raglan has several marae within , affiliated with hapū of Waikato Tainui:
 Poihākena Marae and Tainui a Whiro meeting house is a meeting place for Ngāti Tāhinga and Tainui hapū
 Te Kōpua Marae is a meeting place of Tainui hapū and does not have a meeting house, as it was destroyed on 12 August 1941 to create the airfield
 Te Kaharoa or Aramiro Marae and Te Kaharoa meeting house is a meeting place of Ngāti Māhanga and Ngāti Tamainupō, near the head of the Waitetuna valley

The hapū of Ngāti Tamainupō also have a meeting place, Mai Uenuku ki te Whenua Marae, in the inner harbour, between Te Uku and Waingaro.

In 2018, it produced a local history book about prominent Waikato chief Ngaere and how Ngāruawāhia and the Hakarimata Ranges were named in the late 1600s.

In October 2020, the Government committed $414,300 from the Provincial Growth Fund to upgrade Mai Uenuku ki te Whenua Marae, creating 8 jobs.

Geography
Raglan is associated with Whaingaroa Harbour (also known as Raglan Harbour) on the west coast of the Waikato region in New Zealand's North Island. A 2005 survey said on average water stays in the harbour 1.1 days at spring-tides, but a 2015 study showed a median residence time for whole estuary of 39.4 days with median river flows, ranging between 18 and 45 days. It is the northernmost of three large inlets in the Waikato coast (the others, also drowned river valleys, are Aotea Harbour and Kawhia Harbour). 15 significant rivers and streams run into the harbour, including the largest, Waingaro and Waitetuna, accounting for 60% of catchment area, and the smaller Opotoru and Tawatahi rivers.

A study for Regional Council said, "Whaingaroa Harbour began to fill with sediment at least 8000 years before present (B.P.) and before the sea had reached its present level 6500 years B.P. Rapid sedimentation in the harbour before 6500 years B.P. is attributed to the formation of now relict intertidal shore platforms up to 700-m wide and ≤10 m below present-day mean high water level. These coastal landforms were rapidly formed 8000-6500 years B.P. by physical weathering of soft mudstone cliffs and wave action. Consequently, all but the upper two metres of the present day sediment column was deposited before 6000 years B.P. and thousands of years before the arrival of Maori some 700 years ago. Today, the harbour has largely infilled with catchment sediment up to ~8-m thick, with 70% of its high tide surface area being intertidal." It concluded that most sediment is now swept up to 20 km out to sea.

70% of the land in the harbour catchment is used for farming, 20% of it is under native vegetation, 14% under forestry, 7% mānuka/kānuka and 0.3% wetlands. 68% of land has slopes greater than 1 in 4.

Southwest of the township stands the extinct volcano of Mt Karioi. According to Māori legend Karioi was a jilted Māori Princess who, upon discovering that love was lost, lay down and rests.

North of the harbour mouth there are extensive dunes and dune-dammed lakes. Like the beaches, the dunes are rich in ironsand and have been considered for mining several times. Threats of seabed mining following passage of the Foreshore and Seabed Act 2004 resulted in formation of the opposition group KASM, based in Raglan (see also Mining in New Zealand and Sand mining).

The area is also home to the popular tourist destination, Bridal Veil Falls, which is located 20 kilometres southeast of the township and the unusual Lake Disappear 4 km further on.

Climate 
Average annual rainfall at Raglan 1984–2004 was 1.354m a year. Average temperature and rainfall graphs show an average high of 24C in February and an average low of 8C in July. Raglan usually has no more than a degree of frost and then only for a few hours on occasional winter mornings.

Education 
The current school opened as Raglan District High School in 1937.

There are also primary schools in the nearby settlements of Te Mata, Te Uku and Waitetuna, it is very common in recent years for students to move from the Te Mata, Te Uku and Waitetuna primary schools to RAS when they reach high school due to it being a nearby, bicultural and accepting school full of students that have often already met their contemporaries from Te Mata, Te Uku and Waitetuna.

Surf breaks

Raglan is best known for its surf. Eight kilometres from the Raglan township is a series of surf breaks including Indicators, Whale Bay, Manu Bay, Vortex Bay. Manu Bay was featured in the 1966 movie The Endless Summer  and in the 2010 movie Last Paradise. The traditional name for Manu Bay is 'Waikeri', meaning surging or swirling waters. The former native reserve was bought for a recreation reserve in 1971.

Indicators is a left hand point break that breaks for up to 600m, from 2 to 10 feet+ (Hawaiian scale). It is a long-walled, fast wave with occasional barrels, particularly on the low tide. It picks up a lot of swell and is very consistent. On big days the wave can link up with the next break called Whale Bay.

Whale Bay is a left hand point break that breaks up to 200m in length, from about 2 to 8 feet+. It has two sections, an inside hollow section up to about 4 feet that breaks very close to the rocks, and an outside, slower section from 4 feet up. It has been rumoured by locals to link up with the next break further down-Manu Point-but only on very large swells, making a potential ride of up to 2 km from the top of Indicators, which locals say has only been achieved once.

Manu Bay is a left hand point break which works from 2 to 10 feet+, breaking over 300m. It has alternate hollow and wall sections, occasional barrels, and is usually about 2/3 the size of Indicators.

Vortex Bay is a soft peak east of the boat ramp that sometimes breaks on low tide when the swell is too large for the main three points.

There is also a beach break further down from Manu Point. Ruapuke is another beach break well to the west around the point.

Raglan has hosted a world championship surfing event at Manu Bay in 1998. Raglan is also home to New Zealand's first sanctioned surf school, the Raglan Surfing School which was established in 1999.

Arts 

Visual artists hold regular exhibitions at the Raglan Old School Art Centre.  Fabric artists show their creations in the biennial ArtoWear competition.  There is also a Raglan Arts Trail Guide with an Open Studio Weekend in late January. For Matariki there are displays of Māori art.  Local art is on display in the Show Off Gallery, Kanuka Design, Matapihi Gallery, local cafes and the Raglan Old School Arts Centre. The Arts Centre is in a 19th-century heritage building, the former Raglan School.

Markets 
There is a regular market on the second Sunday of every month at the Raglan Old School Arts Centre in Stewart Street.  This Raglan Creative Market specialises in local crafts, food and art.

Music
There's a live music scene in Raglan.  The International Soundsplash Eco Reggae Festival ran yearly in summer on the Wainui Reserve, between 2001 and 2008 and more recently, and attracted some of the biggest names in roots, reggae and dub, as well as local acts.

The main venue in Raglan for live music is the Yot Club, a regular stop for NZ musicians on national tours.  There is also live music at the Orca Restaurant and Bar, the Harbour View Hotel, the Raglan Club and The Old School.

The New Zealand reggae bands Cornerstone Roots and Zionhill were formed in Raglan.

Walking 
Whaingaroa has a variety of walks, from an easy stroll over the footbridge to the more strenuous Mount Karioi tracks. Walking has been a popular activity here since at least 1915, when the guidebook said, "An hour's walk brings one to the harbour entrance and to the sea coast. Here there is a wide sandy beach with a background of bush-covered cliffs, and the picturesque Mount Karioi close at hand" and went on, "Many suitable landing places are to be found where parties may leave the launch for a ramble ashore or may picnic ‘neath the shade of the kowhai trees". (see also Walking trip resources below)

Cycling 
A  to  bike race, mainly on gravel roads around Mt Karioi, takes place each July. About  from Raglan, Pipiwharauroa Way has  of cycle/walking track, which links to a very difficult  paper road to Waitetuna.

Environment 

Whaingaroa has a high proportion of environmentalists, as evidenced by the existence of several high-profile environmental groups. The proportion of environmentalists in Raglan is indicated by the size of the Green Party vote, which was 28% in 2011 and rose to 30% in 2014 (266 of 867 in the Taranaki-King Country constituency vote and 40 of 152 in Hauraki-Waikato). In 2017 it dropped to 20% (433), but the Labour vote rose from 18% to 40% (872), when Labour also highlighted environmental issues.

The environmentalism has been recognised in local government policy as, "passionate about the arts and protecting its environment".

Whāingaroa Harbour Care 
Whāingaroa Harbour Care has planted more than 2 million trees since it started in 1995.

After discussions in 1994 with the local MP and Minister for the Environment, Simon Upton, about the poor environmental state of the harbour, a meeting was held on 24 March 1995, leading to the formation of Whāingaroa Harbour Care Incorporated Society in July 1995. A plant nursery was set up on Wainui Reserve to collect eco-sourced (with genes better adapted to local conditions) local seeds, grow them into native trees and plant them densely beside streams, to reduce run-off of nutrients and other pollutants by up to 60%.

(see also Environmental organisations below)

Recycling

Recycling in Raglan is managed by a non-profit organization called Xtreme Zero Waste.  Xtreme's stated goal is to create a waste management system for the Raglan/Whaingaroa community in which none of the waste is stored in landfills.  The organization was founded in 2000, after Raglan's landfill closed and the town decided to find an alternative to transporting its waste elsewhere.  Xtreme Waste has recycled an increasing volume and percentage of waste every year, and as of 2010, it diverts nearly three-quarters of the town's waste from reaching the landfill. It operates a recycling center, which is open to the public and offers group tours.

Actor Antonio Te Maioha, who lives in Raglan, has publicly spoken about his own involvement and Raglan's leadership in recycling.  He mentioned that Raglan is one of the few towns in New Zealand with recycling bins in the main street, and describes how people he knew became involved in recycling because of Xtreme Waste's programs.

Water supply 

Tanks at Bow St and Cornwall Rd, maintain pressure. However, in December 2015 use was averaging  a day. Consent allows up to /day (the remainder maintains a flow in the short stream below the spring) from the spring and /day from the well. Despite using less than half the consented water, water meters are planned to be installed and operational by 2017. When last rated Raglan's water got a poor 'Ed' (unsatisfactory level of risk) rating, but work was done in 2014 to upgrade the quality.

History 
The spring was long used as a source of fresh water. In 1862 a dam was built and it was used to power an  waterwheel for a flaxmill. In the early 1950s the spring was again used to power a water-wheel, this time pumping water for use on the farm.

Several residents had bores drilled, but over half (1000) relied on tank water. Of its  the first 50 ft. was in clay, 4 ft. in hard blue shingle tightly packed with a minimum of sandy matrix and 106 ft in papa.

As early as 1927 the government was being asked for help with water and sewage. In 1938, ratepayers petitioned the council for a water supply and in 1938 DSIR reported on Waipatukahu Spring where, "Beautifully clear water rises in a pool perhaps 6 ft. across on the floor of Omahina Creek at a point some  up from the south end of the tidal flat and a few chains above sea-level" and flow had been measured at /day, close to the 4,800 mentioned above.

In 1938 the Council said the annual cost of a loan would be £700 for an estimated total cost of £10,000. Another sewage and water scheme was considered in 1949, but still the cost of a loan was too high. Despite pollution, the Rose St bore was connected to the low areas of town and the camping ground. Council put in a new pump, but it could only pump  /day, so in the 1959 a bore was drilled at Warihi Park, but abandoned in 1962 due to problems with flow and gas in the water. A 1959 £100,000 estimate for Riki springs supply was still considered too expensive.

Finally, in 1961 Council got a £62,000 loan to bring water from Riki Springs, for a pump to lift water up the hill to tanks (another large reservoir was added in 1981), from where it ran by gravity to the top of Bow St.

In October 1963, 4 weeks of dry weather resulted in council carting water to fill empty tanks. By Christmas 1963 household tanks were being filled by long hoses connected to the half-finished mains. On 8 July 1964, the first householders were invited to apply for a supply. There were problems with Christmas peak supplies and an upgrade was installed in 1972. In 1981 an extra reservoir was built in Cornwall Rd quarry.

In the late 1980s, the Community Arts Council got a mural painted on the water tower. It was restored in 2015.

Notable people

Angeline Greensill (born 1948), Māori political rights campaigner and academic
Anna Coddington, contemporary musician
Antonio Te Maioha (born 1970), actor
Dave Currie (born 1945), sports administrator
Joan Fear (1932–2022), painter
Hallyburton Johnstone (1897–1970), MP and farmer
David Pretty (1878–1947), champion axeman and athlete
Edward Puttick (1890–1976), retired soldier
Eva Rickard (1925–1997), Māori rights campaigner
Cort and Annie Jane Schnackenberg, 1860s–1870s missionaries

See also 
 Raglan Chronicle, local newspaper
 List of radio stations in Waikato
 Hauauru ma raki proposed windfarm
 Surf Life Saving Northern Region
 Strawberry Fields Music Festival, held at venues around Raglan in the 1990s and until the early 2000s (decade).
 Raglan Harbour Board Empowering Act
 Futuro, fibreglass "spaceship" house (moved to Christchurch in 2015)

References

External links

Raglan Weather
Raglan Area School

Environmental organisations 
 Whaingaroa Harbour Care 
 Whaingaroa Environment Centre
 Karioi restoration project
 Te Mauri Tau
 Whaingaroa Environmental Defence
Friends of Wainui Bush Park

Transportation 
Civil Aviation Authority bulletin on safety at Raglan airfield
Public transportation from Raglan to Hamilton

Walking trip resources 
 1:50,000 map, also with walking access information
 Walks on Wainui Reserve
 Department of Conservation brochure for Karioi, Bryant Reserve, Karamu Walkway, Bridal Veil and Pirongia
 Heritage strolls in Raglan

Webcams
Raglan Beach webcams: Raglan A and Raglan B, NIWA

 
Populated places in Waikato
Populated coastal places in New Zealand
Surfing locations in New Zealand
Waikato District
Beaches of Waikato
Black sand beaches